El Potrero is a corregimiento in La Pintada District, Coclé Province, Panama. Its population as of 1990 was 2,672; its population as of 2000 was 2,815.

References

Corregimientos of Coclé Province